The following lists events that happened during 2006 in Cameroon.

Incumbents
 President: Paul Biya
 Prime Minister: Ephraïm Inoni

Events

March
 March 23 - More than 100 people die after their boat capsizes in Cameroon.

May
 May 25 - Scientists confirm the theory that HIV originated among wild chimpanzees in Cameroon.

July
 July 3 - United Nations Secretary General Kofi Annan issues a report warning that ongoing fighting in Chad, Sudan, the Central African Republic, and Cameroon are increasingly destabilized and that borders are loosely enforced.

References

 
Years of the 21st century in Cameroon
2000s in Cameroon
Cameroon
Cameroon